Leah Lewis (born December 9, 1996) is an American actress, model and singer who began her career as a child actress. She is best known for her roles as Ellie Chu in the 2020 Netflix film The Half of It and as Georgia "George" Fan in The CW series adaptation of Nancy Drew.

Early life and education
Lewis was adopted from an orphanage in Shanghai, China when she was eight months old and raised in Windermere, Florida. Her younger, non-biologically related sister, Lydia, was later adopted from the same orphanage. Their parents, Frederick and Lorraine Lewis, are both realtors. 

Leah discovered performing arts at Crenshaw School in Orlando, Florida. She also attended Thornebrooke Elementary School in Ocoee, Florida; she also attended Southwest Middle School in Orlando, Florida as well as Gotha Middle School. She and her mother moved back and forth between Los Angeles and Orlando during her teen years. At 17, she went back to Orlando to finish high school at Olympia High School and then moved back to Los Angeles by herself at 20.

Career
At a young age, Lewis started booking commercials. Once her family moved to Los Angeles, she acted in the 2012 Nickelodeon film, Fred 3: Camp Fred as the character Spoon.

In 2013, she auditioned for the fourth season of The Voice, singing "Blown Away" by Carrie Underwood. None of the coaches turned their chairs, meaning that Leah did not make it onto the show.

In 2015 and 2016, she was featured in Disney shows Best Friends Whenever as well as Gamer's Guide to Pretty Much Everything. She also was a main character on season 2 of the Michelle Trachtenberg-produced gq40 web series, Guidance.

Once she moved back to Los Angeles after graduating from high school, she began booking roles in TV shows like Station 19 and The Good Doctor.

Lewis had a recurring role in The CW series Charmed. She then later joined the main cast of another The CW show, a 2019 TV adaptation of Nancy Drew on which she plays Georgia "George" Fan, based on the original character George Fayne.

Her first major film role was as the lead character, Ellie Chu, in the 2020 Netflix film, The Half of It.

Personal life 
Beyond acting, Lewis sings, plays guitar, and does photography. In May 2016, she began dating singer/actor Payson Lewis. The couple coincidentally share the same last name.

Filmography

Film

Television

Web

Music videos

Awards and nominations

References

External links

1996 births
Living people
Actresses from Florida
American adoptees
American television actresses
American web series actresses
Chinese emigrants to the United States
People from Orange County, Florida
21st-century American actresses
American actresses of Chinese descent